Joyce Van Eck is a plant biologist and faculty member at the Boyce Thompson Institute in Ithaca, NY. She is an Adjunct Professor in the Section of Plant Breeding and Genetics at Cornell University.

Education 
Van Eck attended Pennsylvania State University as an undergraduate, receiving a bachelor's degree in plant breeding. She studied plant tissue culture at the University of Delaware with Sherry L. Kitto including the regeneration of mint species from culture. She completed her PhD at Cornell University in 1993. In 2008 she became the director of the Boyce Thompson Center for Biotechnology, and in 2013 was promoted to Assistant Professor.

Research 

Van Eck was responsible for the first use of Cas9 for genome editing in tomato. She used a similar genome editing approach to conduct de novo domestication of the ground cherry. By editing three genes, her lab developed new varieties of ground cherries that were more compact and produced more flowers and larger fruits. She is part of the Physalis Improvement Project which is studying how goldenberries, ground cherries, and tomatillos grow across the country.

References

External links 
 

Living people
Year of birth missing (living people)
American women botanists
American geneticists
Cornell University alumni
Cornell University faculty
Penn State College of Agricultural Sciences alumni
University of Delaware alumni
American women academics
21st-century American women